Harbour Melody is a 1950 West German crime film directed by Hans Müller and starring Kirsten Heiberg, Paul Henckels and Catja Görna. It is part of a group of postwar German film noirs. A gang of criminals plan a raid on a warehouse.

It was shot at the Wandsbek Studios in Hamburg. The film's sets were designed by the art director Herbert Kirchhoff.

Cast
 Kirsten Heiberg as Marietta
 Paul Henckels as Jansen
 Catja Görna as Inge Jansen
 Heinz Engelmann as Heinrich Osthaus
 Wolfgang Lukschy as Klaas Jansen
 Josef Sieber as Freddersen
 Arno Assmann as Bulli
 Peter Mosbacher as Jan
 Joseph Offenbach as Bruno
 Erwin Geschonneck as Emil
 Ruth Lommel as Kesses Mädchen
 Franz Schafheitlin as Arzt
 Josef Dahmen as Barmixer
 Karl-Heinz Peters as Musiker
 Arnold Risch as Polizist

References

Bibliography
 Spicer, Andrew. Historical Dictionary of Film Noir. Scarecrow Press, 2010.

External links 
 

1950 films
1950 crime films
German crime films
West German films
1950s German-language films
Films directed by Hans Müller
Films set in Hamburg
Real Film films
Films shot at Wandsbek Studios
German black-and-white films
1950s German films